The 15th New Jersey Infantry Regiment was an American Civil War infantry regiment from New Jersey that served from September 1862 through 1865 in the Union Army.

The 15th New Jersey Infantry Regiment was organized at Flemington, New Jersey, in July and August 1862. Three companies were recruited in Sussex County (D, I & K), two in Warren (B & H), two in Hunterdon (A & G), two in Morris (C & F) and one in Somerset (E), and all were composed of men of superior physical strength and capacities of endurance. The regiment was mustered into the United States services on the 25th of August and on the 27th left for Washington, numbering nine hundred and twenty-five officers and men, Colonel Samuel Fowler commanding. Reaching the Capital it encamped at Tennallytown, where it remained for about a month, engaged in drill and acquiring discipline for future service. While here, the men were also employed upon the defenses of Washington, slashing timber, making military roads, and throwing up earthworks - Fort Kearny being constructed entirely by their labor.

Original regimental commanders
The following officers led the regiment at the outset. Staff officers, including the Colonel, were generally listed under Company S. Unassigned replacements were listed under Company U.

Colonel Samuel Fowler
Lieutenant Colonel Edward L. Campbell
Major James M. Brown
Adjutant William P. Peymour
Quartermaster Lowe Emerson
Surgeon Redford Sharp
Assistant Surgeon George R. Sullivan
Assistant Surgeon George Trumpore
Chaplain Alanson A. Haines

Original company commanders
Company A - Captain Lambert Boeman
First Lieutenant Thomas P. Stout
Second Lieutenant John R. Emery
Company B - Captain Alfred S. Burt
First Lieutenant Charles M. Fairelo
Second Lieutenant Charles R. Paul
Company C - Captain Ira J. Lindsely
First Lieutenant Erastus H. Taylor
Second Lieutenant Samuel R. Connett
Company D - Captain James Walker
First Lieutenant Lewis Van Blarcom
Second Lieutenant James S. MacDanolds
Company E - Captain John H. Vanderveer
First Lieutenant Stephen H. Bogardus
Second Lieutenant Ellis Hamilton
Company F - Captain George C. King
First Lieutenant Owen H. Day
Second Lieutenant John H. Vanderveer
Company G - Captain William H. Slater
First Lieutenant Henry S. Crater
Second Lieutenant John D. Trimmer
Company H - Captain Andrew J. Wright
First Lieutenant William D. Cornish
Second Lieutenant James Bentley
Company I - Captain James H Simpson
First Lieutenant Cornelius C. Shimer
Second Lieutenant William W. Van Voy
Company K - Captain George W. Hamilton
First Lieutenant William H. Edsall
Second Lieutenant John Fowler

First enlistment

By the time the 15th was formed all regiments were created for 3 years service. Most would reenlist to become "Veteran" regiments when and if their time came.
December 11–15, 1862 - Battle of Fredericksburg
April 30 - May 6, 1863 - Battle of Chancellorsville
July 1–3, 1863 - Battle of Gettysburg, but the regiment was not actively engaged
July 5–24, 1863 - Pursuit of Lee to Manassas Gap
July 5, 1863 - Fairfield, Pennsylvania
July 10–13, 1863 - At and near Funkstown, Maryland
May 5–7, 1864 - Battle of the Wilderness
May 8–12, 1864 - Spotsylvania
May 12 - Assault on the Salient (the "Bloody Angle")
May 12–21, 1864 - Spottsylvania Court House
May 23–26, 1864 - Battle of North Anna
June 1–12, 1864 - Battle of Cold Harbor
June 17–22, 1864 - Before Petersburg, Virginia
August 7-November 28 - Shenandoah Valley Campaign

Statistics
This regiment suffered higher casualties than any other infantry regiment from New Jersey.  At Spotsylvania, the Jersey Brigade of Wright's Division was engaged in a deadly struggle, the percentage of killed in the 15th New Jersey being equaled in only one instance during the whole war.

Officers killed or wounded: 8
Officers died of disease, etc.: 1
Enlisted men killed or wounded: 239
Enlisted men died of disease, etc.: 98
Other: 15

Personal Stories
Personal stories of individual officers or enlisted men should be added to this section in alphabetical order.

Kelsey, William (PVT)
William Kelsey was born in Newton, Sussex County, NJ in December 1844, and was orphaned at a young age. He was working as a farm hand in Lafayette Township when he enlisted as a drummer boy in Company D in July 1862. On June 16, 1863, on the march to the Potomac, just as the order came to fall in line, a stack of arms fell, and the bullet from a musket exploded and struck William C Kelsey in the neck. At first it was thought the carotid artery was cut and he asked the Doctor “Am I dying?” The answer came “You’ll be dead in less than 15 minutes”. He asked for the chaplain and the Rev. Haines was called and prayed earnestly with him while one of the Surgeons thrust his fingers full length into the wound. The Surgeon called for a roll of lint and a roll of linen threads had been brought that had been picked and sent by some school girls in New York. This was rolled into a plug and forced into the wound. He was conveyed to a tent of some Calvary videlles, where he was left temporarily. To the surprise of all, he reached Washington alive and later transferred to the invalid corps. While recuperating, he was made Assistant, Past Master at York, Penn. He was mustered out on May 30, 1865.
He later moved to Brooklyn, NY, where he worked as a chemist (pharmacist), then to Sag Harbor, NY. He and his family eventually settled in Amagansett, NY, joining two fellow soldiers who were Amagansett natives: (Sgt) Lodowick H. King (Co. I) and Marcus Barnes Duvall (Co. E). King and Duvall had joined the 15th New Jersey along with Chaplain Alanson A. Haines, a New Jersey native who was a pastor in Amagansett at the start of the war. Kelsey died in Amagansett on December 6, 1916, and is buried in East End Cemetery.

Losey, Peter (PVT)
Peter Losey was an unmarried farmer in Stillwater Township, Sussex County, New Jersey, when he enlisted at Newton. He served in Company I from first muster on August 11, 1862, until his capture on May 4, 1864, during the Battle of the Wilderness. By July 16 he was at Andersonville where he remained until he was released to the Union with others who were too ill matter. That is, he was too far gone to recover. He was exchanged on November 30 at Savannah, Georgia, and taken to Annapolis where he died of chronic diarrhea on December 20, 1864. Private Peter Losey (no. 287) was buried at U. S. Cemetery Annapolis in 259 Ash Grove.

Further reading
New Jersey and the Rebellion: A History of the services of the troops and people of New Jersey in aid of the Union cause. by John Y. Foster. Published by Authority of the State. Newark, N.J.; Martin R. Dennis & Co. 1868. Chapter XIII. Pages 382–407. Reprinted by Higginson Book Company, Salem MA. 
"Remember You Are Jerseymen!" A Military History of New Jersey's Troops in the Civil War. by Joseph G. Bilby and William C. Goble. Longstreet House, Hightstown NJ. New Book Number 141. 1998. Chapter 11. Pages 270–291. 
RECORD of OFFICERS AND MEN OF NEW JERSEY in the CIVIL WAR 1861 - 1865. VOLUME I.  Compiled in the office of the Adjutant General. William S. Stryker, New Jersey Adjutant General, Published by authority of the Legislature.  William S. Stryker, Adjutant General. (Trenton, NJ: Office of the Adjutant General, 1876. Printed by John L. Murphy, Steam Book and Job Printer)

See also
List of New Jersey Civil War Units

Notes

Units and formations of the Union Army from New Jersey
Military units and formations established in 1861
Military units and formations disestablished in 1865